Ayako Sana (眞恵子 Sana Ayako, born May 18, 1985) is a Japanese volleyball player who plays for Toyota Auto Body Queenseis.

Profiles
Her father and grandfather were Sumo wrestlers.

Clubs
Shukutokugakuen High School → Denso Airybees (2004–2009) → Toyota Auto Body Queenseis (2009-)

National team
 Youth national team (2000)
 Junior national team (2002)

Awards

Team
2007-08 Japan Volleyball League/V.League/V.Premier -  Runner-up, with Denso Airybees.
2008 57th Kurowashiki All Japan Volleyball Tournament -  Champion, with Denso.

References

External links
 Denso Official Website Profile
 Queenseis Official Website

Japanese women's volleyball players
1985 births
Living people